The 2019 FIBA U16 European Championship Division C was the 15th edition of the Division C of the FIBA U16 European basketball championship. It was played in Tirana, Albania, from 14 to 21 July 2019. Nine teams participated in the competition. Luxembourg men's national under-16 basketball team won the tournament.

Participating teams
 (hosts)

  (24th place, 2018 FIBA U16 European Championship Division B)

Group phase

Group A

Group B

5th–9th place classification

Championship playoffs

Semifinals

3rd place match

Final

Final standings

References

External links
FIBA official website

FIBA U16 European Championship Division C
2019–20 in European basketball
2019 in Albanian sport
FIBA U16
International basketball competitions hosted by Albania
Sports competitions in Tirana
July 2019 sports events in Europe